The  Anna Politkovskaya Award was established in 2006 to remember and honor the Russian journalist Anna Politkovskaya (1958–2006), murdered in Moscow on 7 October 2006 in order to silence her reporting about the war in Chechnya.

The award is presented annually by the international human rights organisation, RAW in WAR (Reach All Women in War) and honours women human rights defenders from around the world, who work in war and conflict zones, often at great personal risk. Mariana Katzarova, a friend and a human rights colleague of Politkovskaya, founded RAW in WAR (Reach All Women in WAR) and the Anna Politkovskaya Award in 2006 in London, after being a journalist and human rights advocate in the war zones of Kosovo, Bosnia and Chechnya.

In 2016, to mark the tenth anniversary of the murder of Anna Politkovskaya, an additional special award was presented to a woman human rights defender from Russia who, like Anna Politkovskaya and the first winner of the award, Natalia Estemirova, who was murdered in Chechnya in 2009, has worked to build peace in conflict zones and help civilians trapped between opposing armed forces. The special award was presented to Valentina Cherevatenko who, since 1990, has intervened  in a succession of conflicts in the former Soviet Union, working through her organisation, the Women of the Don NGO.

In October 2018, ahead of the 12th anniversary of the murder of Anna Politkovskaya, RAW in WAR presented the 2018 Anna Politkovskaya Award to Binalakshmi Nepram, a courageous indigenous human rights defender and author from the state of Manipur, on the Indo-Myanmar border area, and Svetlana Alexievich, a brave writer and investigative journalist from Belarus and the 2015 Nobel Prize laureate in literature.

A group of more than 100 influential cultural and political leaders joined the Committee of Supporters for the RAW in WAR Anna Politkovskaya Award. Among them are:
 
 Nobel Women's Initiative
 Mairead Maguire (Nobel Peace Prize Laureate)
 Betty Williams (Nobel Peace Prize Laureate)
 Jody Williams (Nobel Peace Prize Laureate)
 Shirin Ebadi (Nobel Peace Prize Laureate)
 Rigoberta Menchú Tum (Nobel Peace Prize Laureate)
 Archbishop Desmond Tutu (Nobel Peace Prize Laureate)
 Tatiana Yankelevich
 Vaclav Havel
 Jon Snow
 John Pilger
 Amy Goodman
 Jeremy Bowen
 Andre Glucksmann
 Gloria Steinem
 Sergey Kovalyov
 Alexei Simonov
 Vladimir Bukovsky
 Svetlana Gannushkina
 Lyudmila Alekseeva
 Karinna Moskalenko
 Lyse Doucet
 Lindsey Hilsum
 Gillian Slovo
 Eva Hoffman
 Adam Michnik
 Oleg Panfilov
 Tom Stoppard
 Bernard-Henri Lévy
 Natasha Kandic
 Elisabeth Rehn
 Zbigniew Brzezinski
 Mariane Pearl
 Azar Nafisi
 Asma Jahangir
 Carl Gershman
 Hina Jilani
 Susan Sarandon
 Jane Birkin
 Sophie Shihab
 Naomi Klein
 Sister Helen Prejean
 Ariel Dorfman
 Vanessa Redgrave
 Eve Ensler
 Michael Cunningham
 John Sweeney
 Jonathan Schell
 Noam Chomsky
 Marina Litvinenko
 Lucy Ash
 Sussan Deyhim
 Heidi Bradner
 Desmond O'Malley
 Anne Nivat
 Annabel Markova
 Lord Frank Judd
 Lord Nicolas Rea
 Shirley Williams
 Lord Anthony Giddens
 Lord Nazir Ahmed
 Baroness Molly Meacher
 Baroness Vivien Stern
 Baroness Helena Kennedy QC
 Dame Evelyn Glennie
 Yakin Erturk
 Elena Kudimova
 Andrey Nekrasov
 Peter Gabriel
 Stina Scott
 Anna Stavitskaya
 Dubravka Ugresic
 Katrina vanden Heuvel
 Victor Navasky
 Holly Near
 Joan Baez
 Elizabeth Frank
 Elizabeth Kostova
 Bill Bowring
 Irena Grudzinska Gross
 Monica Ali
 Isa Blyden
 Nayereh Tohidi
 Claire Bertschinger
 Tsvetana Maneva
 Elif Shafak

Laureates 

 2007: Natalia Estemirova (1958–2009), Russia / Chechnya
 2008: Malalai Joya (1978–), Afghanistan
 2009: One Million Signatures Campaign for Equality, Iran (human rights lawyer, Leila Alikarami received the award on behalf of the One Million Signatures Campaign) 
 2010: Halima Bashir, Sudan / Darfur
 2011: Razan Zaitouneh (1977–), Syria
 2012: Marie Colvin (1956–2012), USA
 2013: Malala Yousafzai (1997–), Pakistan
 2014: Vian Dakhil (1971–), Iraq
 2015: Kholoud Waleed (1984–), Syria
 2016: Jineth Bedoya Lima (1974–), Colombia and special 10th-anniversary award for Valentina Cherevatenko (1956–), Russia
 2017: Gulalai Ismail (1986–), Pakistan and Gauri Lankesh (1962–2017), India
 2018: Svetlana Alexievich (1948–), Belarus and Binalakshmi Nepram, India
 2019: Alex Crawford (1963–), UK
 2020: Radhya Al-Mutawakel (1967–), Yemen
 2021: Fawzia Koofi (1975–), Afghanistan

References

External links
 RAW for Women and Girl Survivors in War
 “We really need you, Anna!”: The winners of the 2018 Anna Politkovskaya Award, Svetlana Alexievich and Binalakshmi Nepram write a letter to Anna Politkovskaya, 9 October 2018
 "Remembering Anna Politkovskaya, who was killed for telling the truth", The Washington Post, 8 October 2018

British awards
Human rights awards
Awards established in 2007